Merlin Russell "Boody" Gilbertson (July 3, 1922 – May 23, 2015) was an American professional basketball player who played in the National Basketball League for the Sheboygan Red Skins.

References

1922 births
2015 deaths
American men's basketball players
United States Army personnel of World War II
Basketball players from Washington (state)
Deaths from pneumonia in Washington (state)
Forwards (basketball)
Guards (basketball)
Sportspeople from Everett, Washington
Sheboygan Red Skins players
Washington Huskies men's basketball players